Melanostoma  is a large genus of hoverflies. Little is known of their biology, but they are suspected to be general predators of small insects in leaf litter.

Species

M. abdominale Shiraki, 1930
M. aenoscutum Hull, 1964
M. algens Curran, 1931
M. alpinum Szilády, 1942
M. alticola Speiser, 1910
M. annulipes Macquart, 1842
M. apicale Bigot, 1884
M. atrum Sack, 1932
M. aurantiaca Becker, 1921
M. babyssa (Walker, 1849)
M. babyssola Speiser, 1924
M. bergmani Doesburg, 1966
M. bicruciatum (Bigot, 1884)
M. bituberculatum Loew, 1858
M. boreomontanum Mutin, 1986
M. diffusum Hull, 1941
M. dubium (Zetterstedt, 1838)
M. elongatum Matsumura, 1919
M. eversmanni Enderlein, 1938
M. fasciatum (Macquart, 1850)
M. flavipenne Matsumura, 1919
M. flavipleurum Hull, 1964
M. floripeta Speiser, 1910
M. fumivenosum Doesburg, 1966
M. gedehense Meijere, 1914
M. gymnocera Bigot, 1891
M. incisum Matsumura, 1916
M. incompletum Becker, 1908 - Canarian endemic species
M. incurvum Dirickx, 2001
M. infuscatum Becker, 1909
M. keiseri Dirickx, 2001
M. matilei Dirickx, 2001
M. meijerei Goot, 1964
M. mellinum (Linnaeus, 1758)
M. motodomariense Matsumura, 1919
M. normale Curran, 1931
M. ochraceum Dirickx, 2001
M. orientale Wiedemann, 1824
M. otaniense Matsumura, 1919
M. pedius Walker, 1852
M. perinetense Dirickx, 2001
M. pumicatum (Meigen, 1838)
M. pyrophaenoides Speiser, 1910
M. quadrifasciatum Curran, 1928
M. satyriphilum Hull, 1941
M. scalare (Fabricius, 1794)
M. simplex Doesburg, 1955
M. subbituberculatum Kassebeer, 2000
M. sulphuripes Hull, 1964
M. sylvarum Hull, 1941
M. teizonis Matsumura, 1919
M. tenuis Matsumura, 1919
M. tiantaiensis Huo & Zheng, 2003
M. transversum Shiraki & Edashige, 1953
M. trochanteratum Hull, 1964
M. tumescens Szilády, 1940
M. univittatum Wiedemann, 1824
M. violaceum Hull, 1964
M. wollastoni Wakeham-Dawson, Aguiar, Smit, McCullough & Wyatt, 2004

References

Syrphinae
Hoverfly genera
Diptera of Europe
Taxa named by Ignaz Rudolph Schiner
Articles containing video clips